The pianist and pedagogue, William Grant Nabore’ was born in Roanoke, Virginia (USA) where he studied with Kathleen Kelly Coxe, a pupil of Alexander Siloti, the teacher of Sergej Rachmaninov and afterwards with the eminent musicologist, Anne McClenney at the Hollins College in his early years. 

He received a full scholarship to study at the Accademia di Santa Cecilia in Rome with Carlo Zecchi, a pupil of Busoni and Schnabel and also with Renata Borgatti. He received his Master's degree with honors from this institution and afterwards won the First Prize of Virtuosity and the Paderewski Award from the Conservatoire de Geneve. He also studied Musicology with Luigi Ronga at the University of Rome and Harpsichord with Ferruccio Vignanelli at the Conservatorio di Santa Cecilia.

He also studied in England with Denise Lassimonne, the assistant of Tobias Matthay.

He continued his studies with Alicia de Larrocha, Rudolf Serkin, George Szell and with Pierre Fournier for Chamber Music.

He has played all over the world with important orchestras in prestigious venues and chamber music with famous ensembles such as the Amadeus Quartet, the Talich Quartet and the Gabrieli Quartet.

Of a rare musical erudition and authority, he is one of the most respected and celebrated piano pedagogues at present and has formed some the finest young pianists of today.

He has given Masterclasses all over the world and was the founding Director of the International Piano Foundation “Theo Lieven” in 1993 and in 2002 with Martha Argerich as President, he created the famous International Piano Academy Lake Como in Italy.

In 2017 he received the Vendome Award from the Orpheus Foundation of Switzerland for his outstanding contribution to classical music in discovering, teaching and promoting exceptional young pianists.

His students include:
Yulianna Avdeeva, Stanislav Ioudenitch, Alessandro Deljavan, Francois Dumont, Severin von Eckardstein, Gabor Farkas, Chi Ho Han, Martin Helmchen, Emil Gryesten, Claire-Marie Le Guay, Marcos Madrigal, Dmitry Masleev, Arseny Tarasevich-Nikolaev, Cedric Pescia, Roberto Plano, Tomoki Sakata, Margherita Torretta, Alexei Volodin, Ran Jia, Davide Cabassi, Roberto Prosseda, Alessandra Ammara, Bruce Xiaoyu Liu, Daniel Wnukowski, William Youn, and Shunta Morimoto.

And the Legendary Nina Simone.

References

External links
 Website of William Grant Naboré
 International Piano Academy Lake Como

American classical pianists
Male classical pianists
American male pianists
Living people
1941 births
20th-century American pianists
21st-century classical pianists
20th-century American male musicians
21st-century American male musicians
21st-century American pianists